Robert Gordon (July 1870 – 1938) was a Scottish footballer who played in the Football League for Aston Villa, Leicester Fosse and Woolwich Arsenal.

References

1870 births
1938 deaths
Scottish footballers
English Football League players
Association football forwards
Leith Athletic F.C. players
Heart of Midlothian F.C. players
Middlesbrough Ironopolis F.C. players
Aston Villa F.C. players
Leicester City F.C. players
Arsenal F.C. players
Reading F.C. players
Forfar Athletic F.C. players
St Bernard's F.C. players